Asier Antona Gómez (born December 27, 1976 in Bilbao, Spain) is a Spanish politician and senator. He is the current senator representing the Canary Islands in the Senate of Spain. Gomez was appointed senator as a representative from the Canary Islands by the Parliament of the Canary Islands.

Gomez attended the University of the Basque Country where he studied Political Science and Administration and subsequently graduated with a BSc in Political Science. After his education, he went into politics sitting on several committee positions in government minitries.

On April 22, 2016 he was appointed the President of People's Party of the Canary Islands after resignation of José Manuel Soria. Before being appointed President, he was the General Secretary of the People's Party of the Canary Islands. In 2019, he was appointed Senator alongside Fernando Clavijo Batlle to represent Canary Islands.

References 

Living people
1976 births
People from Bilbao
People's Party (Spain) politicians
Members of the 13th Congress of Deputies (Spain)